Jenny Tan (born May 21, 1981 in Jakarta) is an Indonesian television presenter who became anchor of the news program Fokus Indosiar.

Career 
Tan worked as news anchor from November 1, 2007 to November 30, 2011 at Indosiar carried news of Fokus Pagi, Fokus Siang and Fokus malam.

She is now presenter of the Infotainment program Hot Shot on SCTV. and co host of Eat Bulaga! Indonesia on SCTV.

TV programs 
 Fokus Pagi (Indosiar, 2007–2011)
 Kisi-Kisi (Indosiar, 2009–2011)
 Hot Shot (SCTV, 2012–present)
 Eat Bulaga! Indonesia (SCTV, 2012–2014)
 Gang Senggol (MNCTV, 2014–2015)

References 

1981 births
Living people
Indonesian actresses
People from Jakarta
Indosiar